Mohamed Abbou may refer to:

Mohamed Abbou (Moroccan politician), born 1959
Mohamed Abbou (Tunisian politician), born 1966
Mohamed Ait Abbou (born 1985), Moroccan footballer